Son et lumière is French for "sound and light", and may refer to:
Son et lumière (show), a sound and light show
"Son et Lumiere" (song), song by The Mars Volta on the album De-Loused in the Comatorium
Son et lumière (composition), symphonic poem by Steven Stucky
Son et Lumière (company), French television production company responsible for the series Engrenages, shown in English as Spiral